The Autostrada A20 is a toll motorway on the island of Sicily that links the city of Palermo to Messina. The motorway from Messina follows the Tyrrhenian coast for  until it meets the A19 Palermo-Catania at Buonfornello. The motorway A20, at its eastern-end, is also connected to the A18 Messina-Catania.
It's a four lane motorway (two lanes for each direction) in its whole length. Consorzio per le Autostrade Siciliane is in charge of toll collection, management, and maintenance of the motorway.

History
The construction of the A20 was really slow, partially because of the difficult orography of the Tyrrhenian coast.
The first stretch of this motorway, from Messina Boccetta to Divieto, was opened the 1 June 1972 but works for the entire length were completed only the 21 December 2004 with the opening of the exit for Castelbuono.

Messina-Palermo

A19 from Buonfornello to Palermo

References

A20
Transport in Sicily